Steven Miller (born March 23, 1991) is a Canadian football running back who is currently a free agent. He played for the Saskatchewan Roughriders of the Canadian Football League from 2014 to 2015. He also played American football for the Detroit Lions of the National Football League.

Early career 

Miller grew up in Piscataway, New Jersey and attended Piscataway Township High School where he played high school football for the Chiefs, graduating in 2009. In 2008, he ran for 1,322 yards and 20 touchdowns. The Chiefs won the 2008 North Jersey, Section 2, Group 4 championship in his senior year.

Miller played college football for Nassau Community College in 2009 and 2010. In 2010, he won Northeast JC Football Conference Player of the Year and Offensive Player of the Year and helped lead Nassau to the conference championship. He recorded 1,180 rushing yards and 12 rushing touchdowns in his final year with Nassau. In 2011, he transferred to Appalachian State where he played for the Mountaineers. In his senior year, he rushed for over 1,368 yards on 239 carries and 11 touchdowns. Additionally, he recorded 34 receptions for 377 yards and an additional four touchdowns.

Professional career 

In April 2013, Miller was signed to the Detroit Lions as an undrafted free agent. He spent 2013 on the Lions' practice squad, and was cut in 2014 after playing in three preseason games.

Miller was signed by the Saskatchewan Roughriders in October 2014. He played in two regular season games and a post-season game. In the regular season, he ran for 68 yards on 12 carries and acted as a kickoff returner.

References 

1991 births
Living people
American players of Canadian football
American football running backs
Appalachian State Mountaineers football players
Canadian football return specialists
Canadian football running backs
Detroit Lions players
Saskatchewan Roughriders players
Winnipeg Blue Bombers players
Nassau Lions football players
People from Piscataway, New Jersey
Piscataway High School alumni
Players of American football from New Jersey
Sportspeople from Plainfield, New Jersey
Nassau Community College alumni